Nicolas Faret (Bourg-en-Bresse, c.1596 – 8 September 1646) was a French statesman, writer, scholar and translator.

He translated Eutropius's Roman History (Paris, 1621, in-18).

References
 Gustave Vapereau, Dictionnaire universel des littératures, Paris, Hachette, 1876, p. 765

External links
 
 His works on site gallica

1590s births
1646 deaths
Writers from Bourg-en-Bresse
Latin–French translators
17th-century French poets
17th-century French male writers
French male poets
17th-century French translators
Politicians from Bourg-en-Bresse